The Putreda is a left tributary of the river Jijia in Romania. It flows into the Jijia in Corlăteni.

References

Rivers of Romania
Rivers of Botoșani County